Hamed Amiri (born 6 June 1982) is an Iranian Paralympic athlete. He won the gold medal in the men's javelin throw F54 event at the 2020 Summer Paralympics in Tokyo, Japan. He also represented Iran at the 2016 Summer Paralympics in Rio de Janeiro, Brazil and he won the silver medal in the men's shot put F55 event.

He won two medals at the 2017 World Championships held in London, United Kingdom: the silver medal in the men's javelin throw F54 event and the bronze medal in the men's shot put F55 event. At the 2019 World Championships held in Dubai, United Arab Emirates, he won one medal: the gold medal in the men's javelin throw F54 event. As a result, he qualified to represent Iran at the 2020 Summer Paralympics in Tokyo, Japan.

Amiri competed in the Iran's Strongest Man competition for 11 consecutive years, winning the event in 2009. A car accident in December 2011 led to his disability and his eventual decision to enter the field of para-athletics.

Just weeks before the Tokyo Paralympics were due to start, Amiri sustained an arm injury and initially withdrew from the Games as he was unable to continue with his training. After undergoing hospital treatment, he reversed his decision not to enter the event, vowing to put all his effort into his first throw no matter what the cost.

Achievements

References

External links 
 

Living people
1982 births
Place of birth missing (living people)
Iranian male discus throwers
Iranian male javelin throwers
Iranian male shot putters
Athletes (track and field) at the 2016 Summer Paralympics
Athletes (track and field) at the 2020 Summer Paralympics
Medalists at the 2016 Summer Paralympics
Medalists at the 2020 Summer Paralympics
Paralympic gold medalists for Iran
Paralympic silver medalists for Iran
Paralympic athletes of Iran
Paralympic medalists in athletics (track and field)
Iranian powerlifters
21st-century Iranian people
Wheelchair discus throwers
Wheelchair javelin throwers
Wheelchair shot putters
Paralympic javelin throwers
Paralympic shot putters
Medalists at the 2018 Asian Para Games